The Philippine Bar Examination is the professional licensure examination for lawyers in the Philippines. The exam is exclusively administered by the Supreme Court of the Philippines through the Supreme Court Bar Examination Committee.

Brief history

The first Philippine Bar Exams was conducted in 1901 with only 13 examinees. The third Philippine Bar Exam took place in 1903 but the results were released in 1905. José L. Quintos of Baliuag, Bulacan obtained the highest rating of 96.33%, future President Sergio Osmeña, Sr. was second with 95.66%, future CFI Judge Fernando Salas was third with 94.5% and future President Manuel L. Quezon fourth with 87.83%. The bar exam in 1903 had only 13 examinees, while the 2008 bar examination is the 107th (given per Article 8, Section 5, 1987 Constitution). The first Roll of Attorneys were listed since 1945 after the 1944 bar exam. After the 1903 exam, rankings were again avoided until the 1913 exam, with its first English exam and first top ten list of topnotchers led by future president Manuel Roxas from UP Manila with 92%. This meant that every other year from the inaugural 1901 examination to 1912 no scores were given other than pass or fail. The 2016 bar exam had the highest number of passers 3747 out of 6344 (59.06 percent) examinees since 1954, but was later topped in 2020-21 (72.28 percent, the third highest at that point). However, the Supreme Court of the Philippines' Office of the Bar Confidant announced that (a new and official record of) 7,227 candidates will take the 2017 Bar examinations.

Past Bar examinations were conducted every November the University of Santo Tomas. As of February 2022, the Bar examinations had been regionalized and different schools were chosen as venues for the examination, switching to three day schedules in one week. The examination was also converted from the traditional pen and booklet to a now computerized method.

The lowest year was the 1999 bar examinations which recorded the lowest passing rate of 16.59% or with a total number of 660 successful examinees. Also, the 2003 bar exam was marred by controversy when the Court ordered a retake of the Mercantile law due to questionnaire leakage. In 2005, the High Tribunal implemented the "five-strike" rule, which disqualifies five-time flunkers from taking future bar exams.

Admission requirements

A bar candidate must meet the following academic qualifications:
Holder of a professional degree in law from a recognized law school in the Philippines
Holder of a bachelor's degree with academic credits in certain required subjects from a recognized college or university in the Philippines or abroad.

Candidates should also meet certain non-academic requisites:
A Filipino citizen.
At least twenty-one years of age.
A resident of the Philippines.
Satisfactory evidence of good moral character (usually a certificate from the dean of law school or an immediate superior at work).
No charges involving moral turpitude have been filed against the candidate or are pending in any court in the Philippines.

In March 2010 the Philippine Supreme Court Issued Bar Matter 1153, amending provisions in Sections 5 and 6 of Rule 138 of the Rules of Court, now allowing Filipino foreign law school graduates to take the Bar Exam provided that they comply with the following:

 Completion of all courses leading to a degree of Bachelor of laws or its equivalent;
 Recognition or accreditation of the law school by proper authority;
 Completion of all fourth year subjects in a program of a law school duly accredited by the Philippine Government; and
 Proof of completing a separate bachelor's degree.

Committee of Bar Examiners
The Supreme Court appoints memberships in the Committee of Bar Examiners, the official task force for formulating bar exam questions, instituting policy directives, executing procedures, grading bar examination papers, and releasing the results of the annual bar examination.

The committee is chaired by an incumbent Justice of the Supreme Court, who is designated by the Supreme Court to serve for a term of one year. The members of the committee includes eight members of the Integrated Bar of the Philippines, who also hold office for a term of one year. While the Justice who shall act as chairman is immediately known, committee members must exert every effort to conceal their identities until the oath-taking of the successful bar examinees, approximately six months after the bar exam.

Bar review programs
Candidates who meet all the admission requirements usually enroll in special review classes after graduating from law school. These programs are held from April to September in law schools, colleges, universities, and review centers.

Program schedule, content, and delivery differs from one review program to another. Lecturers in these programs are called bar reviewers. They are usually full-time professors and part-time professorial lecturers in law schools and universities. Most review programs invite incumbent and retired justices and high ranking public officials both as a marketing tool and as a program innovation.

Coverage
Bar examinations is conducted during all four Sundays of the month of November. Two bar subjects shall be taken every week, one is scheduled in the morning while another is in the afternoon. The examination covers the following topics and their associated subtopic, popularly known as the bar subjects: 

First Week
Political Law
Constitutional Law
Administrative Law
Law on Public Officers
Election Law
Local Government Code
Public International Law
Labor Law
Labor Standards
Labor Relations
Social Legislation
 
Second Week
Civil Law
Persons and Family Relations
Property
Obligations and Contracts
Sales
Succession
Lease
Agency and Partnership
Trusts
Credit Transactions
Land Title and Deeds
Torts and Damages
Taxation
General Principles
National Taxation
Local Taxation
Tariff and Customs Code
Judicial Remedies (Revised Rules of the Court of Tax Appeals

Third Week
Mercantile Laws
Letters of Credit
Warehouse Receipts Law
Trust Receipts Law
Negotiable Instruments Law
Insurance Code
Transportation Law
Corporation Law
Securities Regulation Code
Banking Laws
Special Commercial Laws
Intellectual Property Law
Criminal Law
Revised Penal Code
Special Penal Laws

Fourth Week
Remedial Law
Rules on Civil Procedure
Rules on Special Proceedings
Rules on Criminal Procedure
Rules on Evidence
Legal and Judicial Ethics
Practice of Law
Code of Professional Responsibility
Code of Judicial Conduct
Practical Exercises

Grading system
The eight bar subjects are separately graded. Each subject contributes to the general average in the following proportion:

The passing average fixed by law is 75%, with no grade falling below 50% in any bar subject.

Passing average vs. Passing rate
The passing average is the minimum grade in the exam required to be admitted to the practice of law. The passing rate is the proportion of total number of bar passers in relation to the total number of bar examinees. It is usually computed on two levels—the national level (national bar passing rate), and the law school level (law school passing rate).

In the past, passing averages were considerably lower to admit more new lawyers (i.e. 69% in 1947, 69.45% in 1946, 70% in 1948). Since 1982, the passing average has been fixed at 75%. This has led to a dramatic decrease in the national passing rate of bar examinees, from an all-time high of 75.17% in 1954 to an all-time low of 16.59% in 1999 (all-time low should have been the single digit 5% national passing rate for the 2007 bar examination if the Supreme Court did not lower the passing average to 70% and lowered the disqualification rate in 3 subjects). In recent years, the annual national bar passing rate ranges from 20% to 30%.

Law school passing rates
The most recent ranking (December 2015) for the top ten law schools in the Philippines by the Legal Education Board is based on the cumulative performance of law schools in the 2012, 2013 and 2014 Bar Examinations. The list only included law schools which had 20 or more examinees:

 University of the Philippines (10%)
 Ateneo de Manila University (9%)
 San Beda University (8%)
 University of San Carlos (7%)
 Ateneo de Davao University (6%)
 University of Santo Tomas (5%)
 University of Cebu (4%)
 San Beda College Alabang (3%)
 Pamantasan ng Lungsod ng Maynila (2%)
 Xavier University – Ateneo de Cagayan (1%)

Role of the Supreme Court, Criticisms

In 2007, only 5% (of the 5,626 who took the 2007 tests, or less than 300) got the passing grade of 75%. Thus, the Supreme Court adjusted the standard to 70% and the disqualification rate in 3 subjects (civil, labor and criminal law) from 50 to 45%. Accordingly, 1,289 or 22.91%, "passed." This passing grade reduction is highly unusual, since it last happened in the 1981 exam when the passing grade was lowered to 72.5%.
Prior to 1982, the passing mark jumped unpredictably from year to year:

In 1954, the Court lowered the passing grade to 72.5%, even if the passing percentage was already at its highest at 75.17%.
In 1999, moves to lower the passing grade to 74% failed, after Justice Fidel Purisima, bar committee chairman failed to disclose that his nephew took the examination. He was censured and his honoraria was reduced to half.

Increasing difficulty
The difficulty of the recent bar examinations, compared to exams of the past, can be attributed to the following factors:

The growing volume of Philippine case and statutory laws is unprecedented. Laws, jurisprudence, and legal doctrines of the past constitute only a small fraction of contemporary Philippine legal materials, which are increasing on a daily basis. 
The 75% passing average with no grade lower than 50% in any subject is already fixed by law. Actual candidates who scored 74.99% in the general average were not admitted to the practice of law, unless they retake the bar exams. 
The Three-Failure Rule is now in place. Candidates who have failed the bar exams for three times are not permitted to take another bar exam until they re-enroll and pass regular fourth-year review classes and attend a pre-bar review course in an approved law school. 
The Five-Strike Rule was implemented from 2005 and ended in 2014. The rule limits to five the number of times a candidate may take the Bar exams. The rule disqualifies a candidate after failing in three examinations. However, he is permitted to take fourth and fifth examinations if he successfully completes a one-year refresher course for each examination. On September 3, 2013, the Supreme Court, issued a resolution, lifting the five-strike rule on bar repeaters.
The four-year bachelor's degree is required before admission to law school. Hence, every bar examinee has to hold at least two degrees—one in law and one in another field. In the past, law schools readily admit high school graduates and two-year Associate in Arts degree holders.

After the end of the Second World War, the passing rate in the succeeding years was remarkably high, ranging from 56 to 72% percent. However, after Associate Justice J.B.L. Reyes, a noted scholar, was appointed Chairman of the 1955 Bar Examinations, the passing rate for that year dropped dramatically to 26.8%, with a failure rate of 73.2%. That ratio has been invariably maintained in the 50+ years since.

Waiting period
The largely essay-type exams are manually checked by members of the Committee of Bar Examiners. Candidates have to wait from the last Sunday of the bar exams in September up to the date of the release of results, which traditionally happens before or during the Holy Week (the last week of March or the first week of April) of the following year.

During this period, candidates (who already hold law and bachelor's degrees) may opt to work in law firms and courts as legal researchers, teach in liberal arts and business colleges, function in companies and organizations using their pre-law degrees (i.e. Communication Arts, Accounting, Economics, Journalism, etc.), help run the family business, or take a long vacation.

Admission of successful bar examinees
The Office of the Bar Confidant of the Philippine Supreme Court releases the Official List of Successful Bar Examinees, usually during the last week of March or the first week of April of every year. Candidates whose names appear in the list are required to take and subscribe before the Supreme Court the corresponding Oath of Office.

Candidates shall take an Oath of Office and sign their names in the Roll of Attorneys of the Supreme Court. The oath-taking is usually held in May at the Philippine International Convention Center (PICC) with a formal program where all Justices of the Supreme Court, sitting en banc, formally approve the applications of the successful bar candidates. The eight bar examiners are officially introduced to the public. A message to the newly inducted lawyers is delivered by one of the justices. Candidates who made the bar top ten list are also introduced and honored. The deans of all Philippine law schools are requested to attend the ceremony and grace the front seats of the plenary hall.

Controversies
In the 1930s, a distant relative of Imelda Romualdez Marcos who was a Justice in the High Court resigned after a controversy involving the bar examinations. 
Justice Ramon Fernandez was forced to protect his name and honor when he resigned because of a bar examination scandal.

On November 23, 1979, the High Court, per Justice Pacifico de Castro ordered new examinations in labor and social legislation and taxation.

On May 7, 1982, 12 of the Supreme Court's 14 justices resigned amid expose "that the court fixed the bar-examination score of a member's son so that he would pass." Justice Vicente Ericta was accused to have personally approached the bar chairman to inquire whether his (Ericta's) son passed the bar. Ferdinand Marcos accepted the resignations and appointed new justices. Chief Justice Enrique Fernando wept at a news conference as he accepted responsibility for rechecking and changing the exam score of Gustavo Ericta, son of Justice Vicente Ericta.

Associate Justice Fidel Purisima, chairman of the bar committee, did not disclose that he had a nephew who was taking the bar examination in that year. He was merely censured and his honoraria as bar examiner were forfeited.

On September 24, 2003, the Supreme Court, per a bleary-eyed Associate Justice Jose Vitug, annulled the tests results on mercantile law after "confirmation of what could be the most widespread case of cheating in the 104-year-old bar exams".

Bar topnotchers
Bar topnotchers are bar examinees who garnered the highest bar exam grades in a particular year. Every year, the Supreme Court releases the bar top ten list. The list contains the names of bar examinees who obtained the ten highest grades. It is possible for more than ten examinees to place in the top ten because numerical ties in the computation of grades usually occur.

From 1913 to 2019, schools which have produced bar topnotchers (1st placers) are as follows:

Two bar examinees topped the bar exams without officially graduating from any Philippine law school:

Jose W. Diokno – former Senator of the Philippines; 1st placer, 1945 bar exams. Mr. Diokno, who tied for Number One with former Senate President Jovito Salonga in the 1945 Bar Exams, would have graduated from the University of Santo Tomas had not World War II supervened.  Mr. Diokno's success in the bar exams is further underscored by the fact that he was also under-age and that he also placed number 1 in the 1940 CPA Board exams which he took while in law school, summa cum laude after graduating from then De La Salle College at the age of 17.  This double number 1 feat may never be paralleled. The closest may have been Cesar L. Villanueva (from the Ateneo Law School) who placed second in the 1981 Bar Exams and sixth place in the 1982 CPA Board Exams and Reginald Laco (from the De La Salle Lipa Law School) who placed fourth in the 2015 Bar Exams and second in the 2009 CPA Board Exams.
Carolina C. Griño-Aquino – former Associate Justice of the Supreme Court; 1st placer, 1950 bar exams. Ms. Aquino (who later became the wife of Mr. Ramon Aquino, 6th placer in 1939 Bar Exams) was a special student of the UP College of Law, where she finished her last two years of law school having taken her first two years of law school at the Colegio de San Agustin in Iloilo.  Ms. Aquino was advised to take her last two years of law school in UP by Colegio de San Agustin Law Dean Felipe Ysmael.  Coincidentally, Mr. Ysmael (a UP Law graduate himself) placed number 1 in the 1917 Bar Exams.  Since Ms. Aquino only took her last two years of law at UP, she can't be certified as an official UP law graduate. Both spouses Aquino (in addition to being topnotchers) also served as Justices of the Supreme Court.

In the past, non-law school graduates were allowed to take the bar. However, the Revised Rules of Court and Supreme Court Circulars allow Filipino graduates of Philippine law schools (and subject to certain conditions, Filipino graduates of foreign law schools) to take the bar, necessarily excluding non-law graduates and foreigners who have law degrees from taking part in the exercise.

While not a guarantee for topping the bar, academic excellence in law school is a good indicator of an examinee's fortune in the bar exams.  Ateneo Law School's only summa cum laude graduate, Claudio Teehankee, placed number one in the 1940 Bar Exams.  It is worth noting that Teehankee's son, Manuel Antonio, followed in his footsteps by graduating at the top of his Ateneo Law School class (albeit, not as summa cum laude) and placing first in the 1983 bar exams.  Claudio's nephew, Enrique (a cum laude graduate from the UP College of Law), also placed number one in the 1976 bar exams.  Claudio eventually became Supreme Court Chief Justice, Manuel was formerly Department of Justice Undersecretary and Ambassador and Permanent Representative to the World Trade Organization in Geneva, Switzerland while Enrique is a successful private practitioner.

This father-son-nephew feat has yet to (and, perhaps, may never) be equalled in the annals of Philippine Bar.  For siblings, the closest is when Manuel B. Zamora, Jr. placed third in the 1961 Bar Exams and younger brother Ronaldo placed first in the 1969 Bar Exams.

The UST Faculty of Civil Law's sole summa cum laude graduate, Roberto B. Concepcion, placed first in the 1924 Bar Exams. He later served as Chief Justice of the Supreme Court.

The San Beda College of Law's sole magna cum laude graduate, Florenz Regalado, ranked 1st in the 1954 Bar exams with a mark of 96.70%. The record is the highest average in the Philippine Bar Examinations, to date. Regalado later served as an Associate Justice of the Supreme Court.

The UP College of Law (which has yet to produce a summa cum laude graduate) had five of its seventeen magna cum laude graduates (the College of Law first conferred the honor to Rafael Dinglasan in 1925 and, to date, last conferred the same honor to Dionne Marie Sanchez in 2007) place number one in their respective bar exams: Rafael Dinglasan in 1925, Lorenzo Sumulong in 1929, Deogracias Eufemio in 1962, Roberto San Jose in 1966 and Ronaldo Zamora in 1969. Dinglasan became a Judge of the Court of First Instance of Manila, Sumulong became Senator of the Republic and a renowned statesman, Eufemio and San Jose established their respective successful private law practices while Zamora became Executive Secretary to then President Joseph Estrada and is currently the Minority Leader in the House of Representatives.

Bar Topnotchers List
The Office of the Bar Confidant releases an official Bar Topnotchers list together with the list of names of all successful bar examinees. The Bar Topnotchers list contains the names of the candidates who garnered the highest general averages in the bar exam for that year. The highest ranking candidate in the list is known as the bar topnotcher. The list has always been the subject of much media attention and public speculation.

Making a place in the list is widely regarded as an important life achievement, an attractive professional qualification, and a necessary improvement in a lawyer's professional and social status.

Below is a listing of all 106 first-placers (from 1913 to 2019) and can be rearranged from highest to lowest in terms of rating obtained. Bar ratings are not exactly comparable from year-to-year as the difficulty of the exams varies through the years. Two bar examinations took place in 1946, first in August to cover the absence of the examination the previous year and in November for the present year. There was a tie in first place in two occasions – in 1944 and in 1999. 

 Due to the ongoing COVID-19 pandemic, the Supreme Court En banc instituted bar reforms pro hac vice in conducting the 2020-2021 bar examinations, including: 
 Digitization and regionalization of the bar examinations.
 Postponement of the bar examination to February 4, 2022 and February 6, 2022.
 Reduction of Bar Coverage to 4 subjects - Laws pertaining to the State and Its relationship with its Citizens (formerly Political Law, Labor Law, and Taxation Law); Criminal Law; Law pertaining to Private Personal and Commercial Relations (formerly Civil Law and Commercial law); and Procedure and Professional Ethics (formerly Remedial Law, Legal Ethics and Practical Exercises).
Requirement of negative results for Antigen test and confirmatory RT-PCR test. 
 Declaration of bar topnotchers is suspended. Examinees who obtain 85% or higher shall be recognized for exemplary performance.

Highest and lowest topnotcher grades
A standard was created in 1940, when Claudio Teehankee (future Supreme Court Chief Justice), from the Ateneo Law School, got a grade of 94.35% when he topped the examinations.  This record was obliterated four years later in 1944 when Jovito Salonga and Jose W. Diokno tied with the highest score of 95.3%. This was the first time that first place ended in a tie.  When they took the 1944 Bar Exams, Atty. Salonga was an undergraduate at the UP College of Law while Atty. Diokno (future Senator) was an undergraduate of the University of Santo Tomas Faculty of Civil Law.  After passing the bar, Atty. Salonga (future Senate President) went back to UP to complete his bachelor's degree in law, earning it in 1946.  The only other instance of a tie at the first place in the bar exams was when Edwin Enrile (salutatorian of his Ateneo Law School class) and Florin Hilbay (an honor student of the UP College of Law) both garnered the same score in 1999.  Atty. Enrile served as Deputy Executive Secretary to President Gloria Arroyo and as a Professorial Lecturer at the Ateneo Law School while Atty. Hilbay is a Professor of Law at the UP College of Law and the current Solicitor General. After another four years, the "bar" was raised a few notches when Manuel G. Montecillo of the Far Eastern University Institute of Law got a grade of 95.50% when he bested all the bar examinees of 1948.  The following year, another record was set when Anacleto C. Mañgaser, an alumnus of the Philippine Law School, got a grade of 95.85% when he topped the 1949 bar exams.

The lowest grade was obtained by Ateneo Law School's Mercedita L. Ona, 83.55%, 2007, which erased the prior record of 84.10%, obtained by Adolfo Brillantes of Escuela de Derecho de Manila (now Manila Law College Foundation) in 1920. Atty. Ona was just the latest of women's first placers.  In 1930, Tecla San Andres (an alumna of the UP College of Law and future Senator) broke the proverbial "glass ceiling" when she became the first woman to top the bar with a grade of 89.4%.  Ameurfina A. Melencio (also an alumna of the UP College of Law and who later became a Justice of the Supreme Court) has the highest grade of all-female bar topnotchers in recorded history when she obtained a 93.85% rating in 1947.

Famous bar topnotchers
Prominent lawyers who made the bar top ten include:

Presidents and Vice-Presidents
Manuel A. Roxas – fifth president of the Philippines; 1st placer (92%), 1913 Bar Exams (UP)
Diosdado P. Macapagal – ninth president of the Philippines; 1st placer (89.85%), 1936 Bar Exams (UST)  
Ferdinand E. Marcos – tenth president of the Philippines; 1st placer (92.35%), 1939 Bar Exams (UP) 
José P. Laurel – third president of the Philippines; 2nd placer, 1915 Bar Exams (UP)
Elpidio C. Quirino – sixth President of the Philippines; 2nd placer, 1915 Bar Exams (UP)
Sergio S. Osmeña – fifth president of the Philippines; 2nd placer, 1903 Bar Exams (UST)
Manuel L. Quezon – second president of the Philippines; 4th placer, 1903 Bar Exams (UST)
Carlos P. García – eighth president of the Philippines; 7th placer, 1923 Bar Exams (PLS)
Emmanuel N. Pelaez – sixth Vice-President of the Philippines; 1st placer, 1938 Bar Exams (UM)
Arturo M. Tolentino – former vice president of the Philippines; 2nd placer, 1934 Bar Exams (UP)

Supreme Court and Court of Appeals Justices
José Yulo – 6th Philippine Chief Justice; 3rd placer, 1913 Bar Exams (UP College of Law)
Ricardo Paras – 8th Philippine Chief Justice; 2nd placer, 1913 Bar Exams (UP College of Law)
César Bengzon – 9th Philippine Chief Justice; 2nd placer, 1919 Bar Exams (UP College of Law)
Roberto Concepcion – 10th Philippine Chief Justice; 1st placer, 1924 Bar Exams (UST Faculty of Civil Law)
Querube Makalintal – 11th Philippine Chief Justice; 7th placer, 1933 Bar Exams (UP College of Law)
Ramon Aquino – 15th Philippine Chief Justice; 9th placer, 1939 Bar Exams (UP College of Law)
Claudio Teehankee – 16th Philippine Chief Justice; 1st placer, 1940 Bar Exams (Ateneo Law School)
Pedro Yap – 17th Philippine Chief Justice; 1st placer, 1946 Bar Exams (UP College of Law)
Andres Narvasa – 19th Philippine Chief Justice; 2nd placer, 1951 Bar Exams (UST Faculty of Civil Law)
Artemio Panganiban – 21st Philippine Chief Justice; 6th placer, 1960 Bar Exams (FEU Institute of Law)
José P. Laurel – former Philippine Supreme Court Justice; 2nd placer, 1915 Bar Exams
J. B. L. Reyes – former Philippine Supreme Court Justice; 6th placer, 1922 Bar Exams
Ambrosio Padilla – former Philippine Supreme Court Justice; 3rd placer, 1934 Bar Exams
Cecilia Muñoz-Palma – former Philippine Supreme Court Justice; 1st placer, 1937 Bar Exams
Ameurfina Melencio-Herrera – former Philippine Supreme Court Justice; 1st placer, 1947 Bar Exams
Irene Cortes – former Philippine Supreme Court Justice; 9th placer, 1948 Bar Exams
Carolina C. Griño-Aquino – former Philippine Supreme Court Justice; 1st placer, 1950 Bar Exams
Isagani R. Cruz – former Philippine Supreme Court Justice; 8th placer, 1951 Bar Exams
Florenz Regalado – former Philippine Supreme Court Justice; 1st placer, 1954 Bar Exams
Adolfo Azcuna – Philippine Supreme Court Justice; 4th placer, 1962 Bar Exams
Antonio Eduardo Nachura – Philippine Supreme Court Justice; 7th placer, 1967 Bar Exams
Presbitero Velasco, Jr. – Philippine Supreme Court Justice; 6th placer, 1971 Bar Exams
Antonio Carpio – Philippine Supreme Court Justice; 6th placer, 1975 Bar Exams
Arturo D. Brion – Philippine Supreme Court Justice; former Philippine Court of Appeals Justice; 1st placer, 1974 Bar Exams
Lucas Bersamin – 25th Philippine Chief Justice; 9th placer, 1973 Bar Exams
Francis Jardeleza- 173rd Supreme Court Associate Justice and former Solicitor General; 3rd placer, 1974 Bar Exams

Senators and Representatives
Manuel A. Roxas – former Philippine Senate President and Speaker of the House of Representatives; 1st placer, 1913 Bar Exams
Manuel L. Quezon – former Philippine Senate President; 4th placer, 1903 Bar Exams
Cipriano P. Primicias - former Philippine Senate Majority Floor Leader; 6th placer, 1923 Bar Exams
Arturo M. Tolentino – former Philippine Senate President; 2nd placer, 1934 Bar Exams
Jovito Salonga – former Philippine Senate President; 1st placer, 1944 Bar Exams
Neptali Gonzales – former Philippine Senate President; 9th placer, 1949 Bar Exams
Ernesto M. Maceda – former Philippine Senate President; 10th placer, 1956 Bar Exams
Franklin M. Drilon – former Philippine Senate President; 3rd placer, 1969 Bar Exams
Lorenzo Sumulong – former Philippine Senator; 1st placer, 1929 Bar Exams
Jose W. Diokno – former Philippine Senator; 1st placer, 1944 Bar Exams
Rene Saguisag – former Philippine Senator; 6th placer, 1963 Bar Exams
Aquilino Pimentel III (Koko Pimentel) – Philippine Senator; 1st placer, 1990 Bar Exams
Sergio S. Osmeña – former Speaker of the House of Representatives; 2nd placer, 1903 Bar Exams
Jose Yulo – former Speaker of the House of Representatives; 3rd placer, 1913 Bar Exams
Antonio Eduardo Nachura – former Samar Representative; 7th placer, 1967 Bar Exams
Ronaldo Zamora – San Juan Representative; 1st placer, 1969 Bar Exams
Prospero Nograles – Speaker of the House of Representatives; 2nd placer, 1971 Bar Exams
Arturo D. Brion – Assemblyman, Philippine National Assembly; 1st placer, 1974 Bar Exams
Gilberto Eduardo Gerardo C. Teodoro, Jr. – former Tarlac Representative; 1st placer, 1989 Bar Exams
José P. Laurel- former Senator; 2nd Placer 1915
Leila de Lima – current Philippine Senator; former Secretary of Justice; former Commission on Human Rights (CHR) Chairperson; 8th placer, 1985 Bar Exams

Appointees and career service officials
Roberto Concepcion – Member, 1986 Constitutional Commission; 1st placer, 1924 Bar Exams
Lorenzo Sumulong – Member, 1986 Constitutional Commission; 1st placer, 1929 Bar Exams
Arturo Tolentino – Member, Philippine Civil Code Commission; former Minister of Foreign Affairs; 2nd placer, 1934 Bar Exams
Ambrosio Padilla – Member, 1986 Constitutional Commission; 3rd placer, 1934 Bar Exams
Diosdado Macapagal – President, Philippine Constitutional Convention of 1971; 1st placer, 1936 Bar Exams  
Cecilia Muñoz-Palma – President, Philippine Constitutional Commission of 1986; Chairperson, Philippine Charity Sweepstakes Office; 1st placer, 1937 Bar Exams
Jovito Salonga – former chairman, Presidential Commission on Good Government; 1st placer, 1944 Bar Exams
Ameurfina Melencio-Herrera – Chancellor, Philippine Judicial Academy; Chairperson, Legal Publications Committee, Supreme Court Centenary Celebrations; 1st placer, 1947 Bar Exams
Andres Narvasa – chairman, Preparatory Commission for Constitutional Reform; 2nd placer, 1951 Bar Exams
Gabriel Singson – former Governor of the Central Bank of the Philippines; 2nd placer, 1952 Bar Exams
Florenz D. Regalado – Member, 1986 Constitutional Commission; 1st placer, 1954 Bar Exams
Jose Nolledo – Delegate, 1971 Constitutional Convention & Member, 1986 Constitutional Commission; 3rd placer, 1958 Bar Exams
Haydee Yorac – former Chairperson, Presidential Commission on Good Government; former Commissioner, Commission on Elections; 8th placer, 1962 Bar Exams
Adolfo Azcuna – Member, 1986 Constitutional Commission; 4th placer, 1962 Bar Exams
Joaquin G. Bernas – Member, 1986 Constitutional Commission; Member, Feliciano Commission investigating the Oakwood mutiny; 9th placer, 1962 Bar Exam
Romeo C. de la Cruz—former Solicitor General; 9th placer, 1957 Bar Exams
Sergio A. Apostol – Chief Presidential Legal Counsel; 7th placer, 1958 Bar Exams
Antonio Eduardo Nachura – former Solicitor General; 7th placer, 1967 Bar Exams
 Fulgencio S. Factoran, Jr. – former Executive Secretary; 9th placer, 1967 Bar Exams
Ronaldo B. Zamora – former Executive Secretary; 1st placer, 1969 Bar Exams
Franklin Drilon – former Secretary of Labor and Employment; 3rd placer, 1969 Bar Exams
Arturo D. Brion – Secretary of Labor and Employment; 1st placer, 1974 Bar Exams
Antonio Carpio – former Chief Presidential Legal Counsel; 6th placer, 1975 Bar Exams
Simeon Marcelo – former Philippine Ombudsman; 5th placer, 1979 Bar Exams
Leila de Lima – former Secretary of Justice; former Commission on Human Rights (CHR) Chairperson; 8th placer, 1985 Bar Exams
Gilberto Eduardo Gerardo C. Teodoro, Jr. – Secretary of National Defense; 1st placer, 1989 Bar Exams
 Janet B. Abuel – Undersecretary, Department of Budget and Management; 1st placer, 1998 Bar Exams

Local officials
Pablo P. Garcia – former Governor of Cebu; 3rd placer, 1951 Bar Exams
Juanito Remulla, Sr. – former Governor of Cavite; 4th placer, 1956 Bar Exams
Henry Villarica – former Mayor of Meycauayan City ; 1st Placer 1971 Bar Exams
Presbitero Velasco, Jr. – Incumbent Governor of Marinduque; 6th placer, 1971 Bar Exams

Academe
Nilo Divina - Dean, University of Santo Tomas Faculty of Civil Law; 4th placer, 1990 Bar Exam
Joaquin G. Bernas – former president, Ateneo de Manila University; Dean Emeritus, Ateneo Law School; 9th placer, 1962 Bar Exam
Jovito Salonga – former Dean, Far Eastern University Institute of Law; 1st placer, 1944 Bar Exams
Neptali Gonzales – former Dean, Far Eastern University Institute of Law; 9th placer, 1949 Bar Exams
Andres Narvasa – former Dean, University of Santo Tomas Faculty of Civil Law; 2nd placer, 1951 Bar Exams
Cesar L. Villanueva – Dean, Ateneo Law School; 2nd placer, 1981 Bar Exams

See also
2010 Philippine Bar exam bombing
Legal education in the Philippines
Integrated Bar of the Philippines

References

External links
2015 Bar Exam Results
Supreme Court of the Philippines
Integrated Bar of the Philippines
Integrated Bar of the Philippines – Negros Oriental Chapter

Law of the Philippines
Legal education in the Philippines
Bar examinations